Merriman is a village in the central Karoo region of South Africa.

References  

Populated places in the Ubuntu Local Municipality